Tanea zelandica, common name the necklace shell or the New Zealand moon snail, is a species of medium-sized sea snail, a predatory marine gastropod mollusc in the Family Naticidae, the moon snails or necklace shells.

Description
The size of an adult shell varies between 15 mm and 33 mm

Distribution
This marine species is found along New Zealand.

References

 Kabat A.R., Finet Y. & Way K. (1997) Catalogue of the Naticidae (Mollusca: Gastropoda) described by C.A. Récluz, including the location of the type specimens. Apex 12(1): 15-26.
 Powell A W B, William Collins Publishers Ltd, Auckland 1979 
 Spencer, H.G., Marshall, B.A. & Willan, R.C. (2009). Checklist of New Zealand living Mollusca. Pp 196-219. in: Gordon, D.P. (ed.) New Zealand inventory of biodiversity. Volume one. Kingdom Animalia: Radiata, Lophotrochozoa, Deuterostomia. Canterbury University Press
 Maxwell, P.A. (2009). Cenozoic Mollusca. Pp 232-254 in Gordon, D.P. (ed.) New Zealand inventory of biodiversity. Volume one. Kingdom Animalia: Radiata, Lophotrochozoa, Deuterostomia. Canterbury University Press, Christchurch.

External links
 
 Quoy, J. R. C. & Gaimard, J. P. (1832-1835). Voyage de la corvette l'Astrolabe : exécuté par ordre du roi, pendant les années 1826-1827-1828-1829, sous le commandement de M. J. Dumont d'Urville. Zoologie
 Récluz, C. A. (1850). Description de natices nouvelles. Journal de Conchyliologie. 1: 379-402

Naticidae
Gastropods of New Zealand
Gastropods described in 1832